Léon Pillet (6 December 1803 – 20 March 1868), was a 19th-century French journalist, civil servant, and director of the Paris Opera from 1840 to 1847. A political appointee, he was probably the least successful director of the Paris Opera in the 19th century.

Early life and training 
Born Raymond-François-Léon Pillet in Paris, he was the son of Fabien Pillet (1772–1855), who was a journalist and French administrator. After attending the Lycée Napoléon (now the Lycée Henri-IV), Léon Pillet continued his studies in law and joined the offices of an attorney by the name of Mauguin.

Journalist 
He took part in the founding of the Nouveau Journal de Paris in 1827, serving mainly as its drama critic. Later, when the suppression of the privileges of the major journals gave more leeway to the enterprise, he became its editor, transforming it into a political newspaper and embracing the liberal cause. In July 1830 he signed the journalists' protest against government restrictions on the press, and during the three days 26, 27, and 28 July, his journal, now known simply as the Journal de Paris, was published several times each day. Having supported the change to a more conservative government which occurred on 13 March 1831, the paper was taken over by venture capitalists who were favorable to the new regime, but Pillet stayed on as director and supported ministerial policies.

Civil servant 
In 1834 Pillet received a government post as maître des requêtes en service extraordinaire and appears in the Almanach royal beginning in 1836 as the Royal Commissioner and Secretary of the Special Commission for the Conservatoire and Royal Theatres. In this position Pillet was the administrator with responsibility for the Paris Opera.

Librettist
Pillet also had aspirations as a librettist. During his time as Commissioner, he cowrote the libretto for the 3-act opera La vendetta with Adolphe Vannois, for which  provided the music. The work was produced at the Opera on 11 September 1839, but was poorly received. It was withdrawn after its seventh performance on 11 October for revision and was compressed to two acts. On 22 January 1840 it was performed in its new version on a double-bill with the 3-act ballet La Somnambule, but ticket sales came to a paltry 1,237 francs and 30 centimes, and it was dropped, after its sixth performance in its revised form on 1 May 1840. Pillet by this time had also written libretti for a series of vaudevilles.

Director of the Paris Opera 
On 1 June 1840, as a political favor, Pillet, who was "neither an artist nor a true entrepreneur", was appointed to a co-directorship of the Paris Opera, where he joined the already resident director, Henri Duponchel. The two men quarreled, and Duponchel withdrew in October 1841, leaving Pillet as sole director, which probably led the German composer Richard Wagner to say that the Opera was run by "political appointees, as a reward." Wagner sold Pillet the sketch of his opera The Flying Dutchman for 500 francs, but was unable to convince him that the music was worth producing. Pillet used Wagner's idea to produce a new opera, Le vaisseau fantôme, with music by Pierre-Louis Dietsch (libretto by Paul Foucher), which failed to please.

Rosine Stoltz, the leading mezzo-soprano at the Paris Opera, became Pillet's mistress, and he began to insist that every opera should have a starring role for her. This eventually caused dissension within the company and a scandal. Pillet may have had a child with Stoltz, if one is to believe the Escudier brothers' La france musicale (April 1843), which reported that they had gone to Le Havre: "Mme Stoltz is suffering from an indisposition which would require nine months to recover from."

On top of this, both the most successful librettist of the day, Eugène Scribe, who blamed Pillet for the continued failure to mount Donizetti's unfinished Le duc d'Albe, and the most successful composer, Giacomo Meyerbeer, who did not want to cast Stoltz in his new opera Le prophète, declined to work with Pillet after 1845. Pillet was attacked by the press and suffered financial losses at the theater.

Pillet invited Giuseppe Verdi to compose an opera for the company in November 1845 and February 1846, but Verdi declined.  Within a week of Verdi's arrival in Paris on 27 July 1847, Duponchel and Nestor Roqueplan joined Pillet as co-directors (31 July 1847), and Verdi received his first commission from the company, agreeing to adapt I Lombardi to a new French libretto with the title Jérusalem. Pillet was forced to retire from his directorship in October or November, and Verdi's "new" opera premiered on 26 November.

List of premieres 
During Pillet's directorship of the Paris Opera, the following works were premiered:
 Giselle (28 June 1841), 2-act fantastic ballet with music by Adolphe Adam (additional music by  Friedrich Burgmüller) and  choreography by Jean Coralli and Jules Perrot
 La reine de Chypre (22 December 1841), 5-act grand opera by Fromental Halévy
 Le guerillero (22 June 1842), 2-act opera by Ambroise Thomas
 La jolie fille de Gand (22 June 1842), 3-act pantomime-ballet with music by Adam and choreography by Albert
 Le vaisseau fantôme, ou Le maudit des mers (9 November 1842), 2-act opera by Pierre-Louis Dietsch
 Charles VI (15 March 1843), 5-act grand opera by Halévy
 La Péri (17 July 1843), 2-act fantastic ballet with music by Burgmüller and choreography by Coralli
 Dom Sebastien (13 November 1843), 5-act grand opera by Gaetano Donizetti
 Lady Henriette ou la servante de Greenwich (1 February 1844), 3-act pantomime ballet with music by Friedrich von Flotow (Act 1), Burgmüller (Act 2), and Edouard Deldevez (Act 3), and choreography by Joseph Mazilier
 Le lazzarone, ou Le bien vient en dormant (29 March 1844), 2-act opera by Halévy
 Eucharis (7 August 1844), 2-act pantomime-ballet with music by Deldevez and choreography by Coralli
 Othello (2 September 1844), 3-act opera by Gioachino Rossini, translated by Alphonse Royer and Gustave Vaëz
 Richard en Palestine (7 October 1844), 3-act opera by Adam
 Marie Stuart (6 December 1844), 5-act grand opera by Louis Niedermeyer
 Le diable à quatre (11 August 1845), 2-act pantomime-ballet with music by Adam and choreography by Mazilier
 L'étoile de Seville (7 December 1845), 4-act grand opera by Michael Balfe
 Lucie de Lammermoor (20 February 1846), 4-act opera by Donizetti
 Moïse au Mont Sinai (23 March 1846), oratorio by Felicien David
 Paquita (1 April 1846), 2-act pantomime-ballet with music by Deldevez and choreography by Mazilier
 Le roi David (3 June 1846), 3-act opera by Auguste Mermet
 L'âme en peine (29 June 1846), 2-act opera by Flotow
 Betty (10 July 1846), 2-act ballet with music by Thomas and choreography by Mazilier
 Robert Bruce (30 December 1846), 3-act pastiche opera with music by Rossini
 Ozaï (26 April 1847), 2-act pantomime-ballet with music by Casimir Gide and choreography by Coralli
 La bouquetière (31 May 1847), 1-act opera by Adam
 La Fille de marbre (20 October 1847), 2-act pantomime-ballet with music by Cesare Pugni and choreography by Arthur Saint-Léon
 Jérusalem (26 November 1847), 4-act grand opera by Giuseppe Verdi (premiered shortly after Pillet's retirement)

Later career 
In 1849 Pillet was appointed the French consul to Nice, where he remained until 1861, when he became the consul to Palermo, and subsequently the consul to Venice. He died in Venice.

References
Notes

Sources
 Fauser, Annegret, editor; Everist, Mark, editor (2009). Music, Theater, and Cultural Transfer. Paris, 1830–1914. Chicago: The University of Chicago Press. .
 Fontaine, Gerard (2003). Visages de marbre et d'airain: La collection de bustes du Palais Garnier. Paris: Monum, Éditions du patrimoine. .
 Fulcher, Jane (1987). The Nation's Image: French Grand Opera as Politics and Politicized Art. Cambridge: Cambridge University Press. .
 Gerhard, Anselm (1998). The Urbanization of Opera: Music theatre in Paris in the Nineteenth Century, translated from French to English by Mary Whittall. Chicago: University of Chicago Press. .
 Gregor-Dellin, Martin (1983). Richard Wagner: his life, his work, his Century. London: William Collins, .
 Guest, Ivor (2008). The Romantic Ballet in Paris. Alton, Hampshire, UK: Dance Books. .
 Huebner, Steven (2001). "Pillet, Léon (François Raymond" in The New Grove Dictionary of Opera, Stanley Sadie, editor, vol. 3, p. 1013. London: Macmillan. .
 Jordan, Ruth (1994). Fromental Halévy: His Life & Music, 1799–1862. London: Kahn & Averill. .
 Lajarte, Théodore (1878). Bibliothèque musicale du Théâtre de l'Opéra, volume 2 [1793–1876]. Paris: Librairie des Bibliophiles. View at Google Books.
 Larousse, Pierre (1874). Grand dictionnaire universel du XIXe siècle, vol. 12. Paris. View at Internet Archive.
 Levin, Alicia (2009). "A documentary overview of musical theaters in Paris, 1830–1900" in Fauser 2009, pp. 379–402.
 Parturier, Maurice, editor (1942). Prosper Mérimée: Correspondence générale: Établie et annotée par Maurice Parturier avec la collaboration de Pierre Josserand et Jean Mallion, vol. 2 [1836–1840]. Paris: Le Divan. .
 Pitou, Spire (1990). The Paris Opéra: An Encyclopedia of Operas, Ballets, Composers, and Performers. Growth and Grandeur, 1815–1914. New York: Greenwood Press. .
 Vapereau, G. (1858). Dictionnaire universel des contemporains, vol. 2. Paris: Hachette. View at Google Books.
 Walker, Frank (1962). The Man Verdi. New York: Knopf. . London: Dent. . Chicago: The University of Chicago Press (1982 paperback reprint with a new introduction by Philip Gossett). .

Writers from Paris
1803 births
1868 deaths
Opera managers
French theatre managers and producers
Directors of the Paris Opera
French opera librettists
19th-century French journalists
French male journalists
19th-century French male writers